Alexander Marshall Waller (born 14 February 1990) is a rugby union player for Premiership side Northampton Saints.

Club career 
Born in Kettering, Waller is a product of the Northampton Saints Academy and made his debut in November 2009 against the Ospreys.

Waller soon established himself in the Saints' first team and featured in their double winning season five years after hit first run out in a Saints shirt. The young prop began both the European Rugby Challenge Cup and Aviva Premiership finals on the bench but came on at Twickenham to score the Premiership winning try in extra time as Saints beat Saracens to claim the title.

Since then Waller has become a regular fixture in the Saints team and in the 2017/18 racked up his 150th consecutive appearance in the Aviva Premiership to take the title for the most consecutive appearances in the league’s history. Waller also turned out for his 200th appearance in a Saints shirt that season.

Most recently Waller helped Saints secure European Champions Cup rugby for 2017/18 as Saints beat Stade Francais in the European Champions Cup play-off final to claim the last spot in the top-tier of Europe for next season.

International career 
In January 2014 he was named as an injury replacement in the England Saxons squad for the game against the Ireland Wolfhounds. The call up marked his first inclusion in any of England's representative teams. He made his debut in the match as the Saxons slipped to a 14–8 defeat, and earned a second cap the following week against Scotland A. In May that year, Waller was among a group of 16 players called up after the Premiership Final to join up with the senior England squad for the three Test summer tour of New Zealand.

Waller was named on the bench for the non-capped England XV game against the Barbarians on 31 May 2015.

Honours 
Northampton Saints
Premiership: 2013–14 (winners)
European Challenge Cup: 2013–14 (winners)

References

External links 

Alex Waller profile at Northampton Saints

1990 births
Living people
Rugby union players from Kettering
English rugby union players
Rugby union props
Northampton Saints players
People educated at Wellingborough School